Pavol Diňa (born 11 July 1963 in Snina) is a Slovak football coach and former striker. He became the Slovak Superliga 1993-94 top goalscorer, netting 19 goals. Diňa scored 90 goals in the Czechoslovak League and 41 goals in the Slovak League.

References

External links

1963 births
Living people
People from Snina
Sportspeople from the Prešov Region
Association football forwards
Slovak footballers
Slovakia international footballers
FC VSS Košice players
Slovak Super Liga players
Slovak football managers
FK Dukla Banská Bystrica players
FC DAC 1904 Dunajská Streda players
FC Lokomotíva Košice players
MFK Zemplín Michalovce players
ŠK Futura Humenné players